César Orlando Salazar Martínez (born January 3, 1988 in San Luis Potosí), known as César Salazar, is a professional squash player who represents Mexico. He reached a career-high world ranking of World No. 25 in September 2015. He won a Gold and a Silver medal at the 2011 Pan American Games, in the Team and Singles. His twin brother Arturo Israel Salazar Martínez is also a professional squash player.

References

External links 
 
 

1988 births
Living people
Mexican male squash players
Pan American Games gold medalists for Mexico
Pan American Games silver medalists for Mexico
Pan American Games medalists in squash
Squash players at the 2011 Pan American Games
Squash players at the 2015 Pan American Games
Squash players at the 2019 Pan American Games
Medalists at the 2011 Pan American Games
Medalists at the 2015 Pan American Games
Medalists at the 2019 Pan American Games
Competitors at the 2017 World Games
Sportspeople from San Luis Potosí
Twin sportspeople
Mexican twins